The 1961–62 Eredivisie was the 2nd season of the highest-level basketball league in the Netherlands, and the 16th season of the top flight Dutch basketball competition. Landlust Amsterdam won the title and qualified for the 1962–63 FIBA European Champions Cup.

Standings

References 

Dutch Basketball League seasons
1961–62 in European basketball